Here is a list of successive mayors of the City of Moncton, New Brunswick. It also includes a list of mayors of the former municipality of Lewisville.

References

Sources
 
 

 
Moncton